Mallavaram is a village in Eluru district in the state of Andhra Pradesh in India.

Demographics

 India census, Mallavaram has a population of 552 of which 283 are males while 269 are females. Average Sex Ratio is 951. Child population is 50 which makes up 9.06% of total population of village with sex ratio 1381. In 2011, literacy rate of the village was 78.49% when compared to 67.02% of Andhra Pradesh.

See also 
 Eluru district

References

External links

Villages in Eluru district